Vidal Sancho (born 1977 in Bilbao, Spain), is a Spanish actor.

Filmography

External links
 
 The Inaccessible Blog: An interview with Vidal Sancho (The Spaniard)
 Pokfulam Rd Productions 薄扶林道© • VIDAL SANCHO is GAVIN.

1977 births
Living people
People from Bilbao
Spanish male film actors
Spanish male television actors